Leonard Henry John Wilkins (12 August 1920 – March 2009) was an Irish professional footballer who played as a full back or centre half in the Football League for Brighton & Hove Albion.

Life and career
Wilkins was born in 1920 in Dublin and raised in London. He served as a sergeant in the Royal Electrical and Mechanical Engineers during the Second World War, and played for Guildford City of the Southern League while stationed in the area. He signed for Brighton & Hove Albion in October 1948, initially as an amateur, and by the time he turned professional after his demobilisation in July 1950, he had already made 27 appearances in the Third Division South. He played in a further 20 first-team matches as a professional, but lost his place before the 1951–52 season and was sold at the end of it, to Bedford Town of the Southern League for a fee of £3,500.

He was ever-present in his first season and was appointed captain. When Ronnie Rooke was removed as manager halfway through the 1953–54 season, Wilkins and Doug Gardiner acted as joint caretakers for some months. Wilkins was released at the end of the season, having made 109 appearances, of which 83 were in the Southern League. He rejoined Rooke at Haywards Heath of the Metropolitan & District League, and remained with them for some years, as player, player-coach, and manager.

Outside football, he worked as a wholesale confectionery salesman. Wilkins died in Cornwall in 2009 at the age of 88.

References

1920 births
2009 deaths
Association footballers from Dublin (city)
Footballers from Greater London
Republic of Ireland association footballers
Association football defenders
Guildford City F.C. players
Brighton & Hove Albion F.C. players
Bedford Town F.C. players
Haywards Heath Town F.C. players
Southern Football League players
English Football League players
Northern Premier League players
Northern Football League players
British Army personnel of World War II
Royal Electrical and Mechanical Engineers soldiers
Military personnel from Dublin (city)